The 2016 Wisconsin Republican presidential primary was held on April 5 in the U.S. state of Wisconsin as one of the Republican Party's primaries ahead of the 2016 presidential election. Texas senator Ted Cruz won the contest with 48%, ahead of nationwide frontrunner Donald Trump by 13 percentage points. Taking advantage of the state's two-level "winner takes all" provision, Cruz took 36 out of the 42 available delegates.

The Wisconsin Democratic primary, held on the same day in conjunction with the Republican primary, yielded a win for Bernie Sanders, who defeated nationwide frontrunner Hillary Clinton by 13 percentage points. With no other primaries being scheduled for that day by either party and just two weeks ahead of the important New York primary, the Wisconsin primary was in the national spotlight.

The two parties' primaries were held in conjunction with this year's Wisconsin judicial elections, where Wisconsin Supreme Court justice Rebecca Bradley was confirmed for a 10-year elected term, winning over Appeals Court judge JoAnne Kloppenburg.

Despite Ted Cruz's win, the eventual nominee, Donald Trump, went on to win the state on Election Day, held on November 8.

Procedure

State primary procedure
As Wisconsin held an open primary, residents could choose freely which party's primary they wished to participate in, when showing up at the polls on election day, regardless of their official registration with either party or none. Polling stations were opened between 7 a.m. and 8 p.m. Central Time.

The two parties' primaries were held in conjunction with this year's Wisconsin judicial elections that included the election of the Wisconsin Supreme Court justice.

Republican nomination procedure
The Republican Party of Wisconsin pledges all of its 42 delegates to the 2016 Republican National Convention based on the popular vote at the primary election on the basis of a "Winner takes all" provision. However, only the 18 at-large delegates are awarded to the statewide plurality winner, while the 24 district delegates, three for each of the state's eight congressional districts, are given to the district-wide winner.

Candidates
While twelve candidates appeared on the Republican primary ballot, only three of the candidates actively campaigned for the Wisconsin contest, after all other candidates had already suspended their campaigns.

Presidential debate in Milwaukee, November 2015

The Republican Party held its fourth presidential debate on November 10, 2015 in Milwaukee, at the Milwaukee Theatre. Moderated by Neil Cavuto, Maria Bartiromo  and Gerard Baker, the debate aired on the Fox Business Network and was sponsored by The Wall Street Journal. Eight candidates including Donald Trump, Ben Carson, Marco Rubio, Ted Cruz, Jeb Bush, Carly Fiorina, John Kasich, and Rand Paul, participated in the primetime debate that was mostly focused on jobs, taxes, and the general health of the U.S. economy, as well as on domestic and international policy issues. The accompanying undercard debate featured Chris Christie, Mike Huckabee, Rick Santorum, and Bobby Jindal who ended his campaign a week after the debate.

Campaigns
Social conservative Texas senator Ted Cruz, who enjoyed the endorsement of the united Republican Party establishment, including Wisconsin Governor Scott Walker, was expected to come out in front. Most polls saw him leading the current national frontrunner, populist New York businessman Donald Trump narrowly by single-digits. Trump maintained he would prevail in spite of the Republican establishment endorsing Cruz, and was "going to have a really, really big victory". With the Never Trump camp closing ranks around an expected Cruz victory in Wisconsin, the third candidate, fiscal conservative Ohio governor John Kasich, was not expected to be competitive in the more populous areas of Wisconsin, and shifted his focus on the more rural congressional districts in order to win at least some of the per-district delegates. Just a few days ahead of the primary, Trump openly asked Kasich to drop out of the race. Kasich was also heavily attacked in TV commercial by both frontrunners' SuperPACs.

Opinion polling

Results

With 48.25% of the statewide vote, Texas senator Ted Cruz distanced nationwide frontrunner Donald Trump by some 13%, thereby winning all 18 at-large delegates. Out of the eight congressional districts, Cruz won in six, therefore receiving another 18 district-wide delegates, while Donald Trump took home six district-wide delegates from western Wisconsin, where he won the 3rd and the 7th congressional districts.

Reactions and aftermath
Cruz's unexpectedly large victory in Wisconsin was widely seen as a turning point for the Donald Trump campaign, making it less likely for Trump to win an outright majority of all national delegates, even if he should win a plurality of delegates. Without an outright majority in the 2016 Republican National Convention's first ballot, the delegates won by Trump would be able to switch to Cruz or another candidate in subsequent ballots, as they were pledged to support him only in the first ballot. Given the Republican establishment's pressure not to nominate Trump, many commentators expected Cruz to be better positioned in subsequent ballots. The theory of Trump's demise proved to be false. As the primary schedule moved to the Northeast, including his home state  of New York, Trump increased his margin of victory and won almost all of the delegates. Finally, with his victory in the Indiana primary, Trump became the presumptive nominee.

References

Wisconsin
Republican primary
2016
April 2016 events in the United States